Ilex longzhouensis is a species of plant in the family Aquifoliaceae. It is endemic to China.

References

longzhouensis
Endemic flora of China
Endangered flora of Asia
Taxonomy articles created by Polbot